The 1991 IBF World Championships (World Badminton Championships) were held in Copenhagen, Denmark in 1991. Following the results of the men's singles.

Main stage

Section 1

Section 2

Section 3

Section 4

Section 5

Section 6

Section 7

Section 8

Section 9

Section 10

Section 11

Section 12

Section 13

Section 14

Section 15

Section 16

Final stage

References
Results

1991 IBF World Championships